Favored Nations Entertainment is a record label founded in 1999 by guitarist Steve Vai and Ray Scherr, former owner of Guitar Center.

The first album released by the label was Coming to Your Senses by guitarist Frank Gambale in 2000. Soon after, a variety of artists were signed, such as Johnny A., Larry Carlton, Peppino D'Agostino, Marty Friedman, Johnny Hiland, Allan Holdsworth, Eric Johnson, Stanley Jordan, Steve Lukather, Novecento, John Petrucci, Eric Sardinas, Neal Schon, Andy Timmons, Dave Weiner, The Yardbirds, and Dweezil Zappa.

Favored Nations was followed by the creation of separate branches, Favored Nations Acoustic in 2002 and Favored Nations Cool in 2004. Pro-Found is a sister label that promotes Favored Nations artists through the Favored Nations and ProFound websites.

Notable artists

Favored Nations
Eric Johnson
Eric Sardinas
Andy Timmons
Steve Vai
Johnny A.
The Yardbirds
Tony Macalpine
Mattias Eklundh

Favored Nations Acoustic
Philip Aaberg
Peppino D'Agostino
Pierre Bensusan
Tommy Emmanuel
Peter Huttlinger
Adrian Legg
James Robinson

Favored Nations Cool
Larry Coryell
Mimi Fox
Novecento featuring Stanley Jordan

References

External links
Official website

American independent record labels
Record labels established in 1999
Rock record labels
1999 establishments in California